Jiří Záleský (born 20 October 1965) is a retired Czech football midfielder.

References

1965 births
Living people
Czech footballers
FC Zbrojovka Brno players
FC Baník Ostrava players
Dukla Prague footballers
Xanthi F.C. players
FC Hradec Králové players
Panserraikos F.C. players
Czech First League players
Association football midfielders
Czech expatriate footballers
Expatriate footballers in Greece
Czech expatriate sportspeople in Greece
Czechoslovakia under-21 international footballers
Footballers from Brno